The 2018 Sacramento State Hornets football team represented California State University, Sacramento as a member of the Big Sky Conference during the 2018 NCAA Division I FCS football season. Led by Jody Sears in his fifth and final season as head coach, Sacramento State compiled an overall record of 2–8 with a mark of 0–7 in conference play, placing last out of 13 teams in the Big Sky. The Hornets played home games at Hornet Stadium in Sacramento, California.

On November 26, Sears was fired. He finished his tenure at Sacramento State with a record of 20–35.

Previous season
The Hornets finished the 2017 season 7–4, 6–2 in Big Sky play to finish in a three-way tie for third place.

Preseason

Big Sky Kickoff
On July 16, 2018, during the Big Sky Kickoff in Spokane, Washington, the Hornets were predicted to finish in fifth place in the coaches poll and seventh place in the media poll.

Preseason All-Conference Team
The Hornets had three players selected to the Preseason All-Conference Team.

Andre Lindsey – Sr. WR

George Obinna – Sr. DE

Mister Harriel – Sr. S

Schedule

Despite Northern Colorado also being a member of the Big Sky Conference, the September 15 game against Sacramento State was considered a non-conference game.

Game summaries

St. Francis (IL)

at San Diego State

at Northern Colorado

at Montana

Cal Poly

at Southern Utah

North Dakota

Portland State

at Weber State

at UC Davis

References

Sacramento State
Sacramento State Hornets football seasons
Sacramento State Hornets football